Gestadienol, also known as 6-dehydro-17α-hydroxy-19-norprogesterone, is a steroidal progestin of the 19-norprogesterone group that was never marketed.

See also
 Gestadienol acetate

References

Abandoned drugs
Tertiary alcohols
Enones
Norpregnanes
Progestogens